Lecithocera jugalis is a moth in the family Lecithoceridae. It was described by Edward Meyrick in 1918. It is found in southern India.

The wingspan is about 11 mm. The forewings are pale ochreous, suffused with light fuscous except towards the costa anteriorly. The discal stigmata are black. The hindwings are grey.

References

Moths described in 1918
jugalis